The Walking Liberty half dollar is a silver 50-cent piece or half dollar coin that was issued by the United States Mint from 1916 to 1947; it was designed by Adolph A. Weinman, a well-known sculptor and engraver.

In 1915, the new Mint Director, Robert W. Woolley, came to believe that he was not only allowed but required by law to replace coin designs that had been in use for 25 years. He therefore began the process of replacing the Barber coinage: dimes, quarters, and half dollars, all bearing similar designs by long-time Mint Engraver Charles E. Barber, and first struck in 1892. Woolley had the Commission of Fine Arts conduct a competition, as a result of which Weinman was selected to design the dime and half dollar.

Weinman's design of Liberty striding towards the Sun for the half dollar proved difficult to perfect, and Treasury Secretary William G. McAdoo, whose department included the Mint, considered having Barber create his own design. Mint officials were successful in getting Weinman's design into production, although it never struck very well, which may have been a factor in its replacement by the Franklin half dollar beginning in 1948. Nevertheless, art historian Cornelius Vermeule considered the piece to be among the most beautiful US coins. Since 1986, a modification of Weinman's obverse design has been used for the American Silver Eagle, and the half dollar was issued in gold for its centennial in 2016.

Inception 

On , the United States Congress passed an act providing:

The Barber coinage was introduced in 1892; dimes, quarter dollars, and half dollars with similar designs by Mint Engraver Charles E. Barber. The new pieces attracted considerable public dissatisfaction. Beginning in 1905, successive presidential administrations had attempted to bring modern, beautiful designs to United States coins. Following the redesign of the double eagle, eagle, half eagle and quarter eagle in 1907 and 1908, as well as the cent and nickel redesigns of 1909 and 1913 respectively, advocates of replacing the Barber coins began to push for the change when the coins' minimum term expired in 1916. As early as 1914, Victor David Brenner, designer of the Lincoln cent, submitted unsolicited designs for the silver coins. He was told in response that Secretary of the Treasury William G. McAdoo was completely occupied with other matters.

On , an interview with Philadelphia Mint Superintendent Adam M. Joyce appeared in the Michigan Manufacturer and Financial Record:

In January 1915, Assistant Secretary of the Treasury William P. Malburn sent McAdoo a memorandum about the silver subsidiary coinage, noting that "the present silver half dollar, quarter, and dime were changed in 1892, and a new design may, therefore, be adopted in 1916. This can be done any time in the year." In reply, McAdoo wrote "let the mint submit designs before we try anyone else" on the memorandum.

In April 1915, Robert W. Woolley took office as Mint Director. On , he asked Joyce to request Engraver Barber, then in his 36th year in office, to prepare new designs. The same day, Malburn requested the opinion of the Treasury Department's Solicitor concerning the Mint view that it could strike new designs for the three denominations in 1916. On , the Solicitor's Office responded that the Mint could change the designs. At the time, the Mint was intensely busy producing the Panama-Pacific commemorative coin issue, and immediate action was not taken. In October, Barber was summoned to Washington to discuss coin designs with Woolley, although it is uncertain whether or not he had by then prepared sketches for the new coinage.

On , Woolley met with the Commission of Fine Arts. Woolley asked the Commission to view sketches produced by the Mint's engraving department. Barber was present to explain the coinage process to the Commission members. Woolley suggested to the members that if they did not like the Mint's work, they should select sculptors to submit designs for the new pieces. It was Woolley's intent to have distinct designs for the dime, quarter and half dollar—previously, the three pieces had been near-identical. The director informed the Commission that as the existing coinage had been in use for 25 years, it would have to be changed—which numismatic historian David Lange calls a "misinterpretation of the coinage laws".

The Commission disliked the sketches from the Mint (submitted by Barber) and selected sculptors Adolph Weinman, Hermon MacNeil and Albin Polasek to submit proposals for the new coins. The sculptors could submit multiple sketches. Although the Mint could decide to use a design on a denomination not intended by its sculptor, the designs were not fully interchangeable—by statute, an eagle had to appear on the reverse of the quarter and half dollar, but could not appear on the dime. Woolley hoped that each sculptor would be successful with one piece.

The three sculptors submitted design sketches in mid-February, and on  met with Woolley in New York City to make presentations of their work and answer his questions. After discussions between Woolley and McAdoo, Weinman was notified on  that five of his sketches had been selected—for the dime and half dollar, and the reverse of the quarter. The same day, Woolley wrote to MacNeil to tell him he would sculpt the quarter's obverse, and to Polasek to inform him of his lack of success. Members of the Commission persuaded Woolley that so much should not be entrusted to a single artist, and MacNeil was allowed to design both sides of the quarter, subject to the sculptor producing a design satisfactory to Woolley.

On , the new coins were publicly announced, with the Treasury noting, "[d]esigns of these coins must be changed by law every 25 years and the present 25-year period ends with 1916." The press release indicated that the Treasury hoped production of the new coins would begin in about two months, once the designs were finalized. According to numismatic historian Walter Breen, Barber became "sullen and totally uncooperative". Lange notes that "numerous delays were encountered as the artists fine-tuned their models while simultaneously avoiding obstacles thrown in their path by Barber. While his observations regarding many aspects of practical coinage were quite accurate, they clearly could have been presented in a more constructive manner." In his book on Mercury dimes, Lange notes that Barber, by then aged 75, had been "compelled over the past ten years to participate in the systematic undoing of a lifetime's achievements"; he had to participate in the process which resulted in coins designed by others replacing ones designed by him.

With the new pieces, all American coins would have had a recent change of design (the Morgan dollar was not then being struck). According to a column in The Art World magazine later in 1916,

Design 

According to Secretary McAdoo in his 1916 annual report,

Weinman's obverse bears a resemblance to Oscar Roty's "Sower" design for French coins; according to numismatic historian Roger Burdette "Weinman has taken the ideal of a nineteenth century provincial figure and turned it into an American icon".  Burdette ties both the appearance of the head of Liberty and of the branches which she carries to Baltimore's Union Soldiers and Sailors Monument, designed by Weinman. The sculptor may also have drawn inspiration from a 1913 bust he did of his tenant, Elsie Stevens, wife of lawyer and poet Wallace Stevens. Elsie Stevens is generally believed to have been a model for Weinman's Mercury dime; her daughter Holly wrote in 1966 that her mother had been the model for both coins. The reverse is similar to Weinman's medal for the American Institute of Architects, although the sculptor replaced the laurel on the medal with a pine sapling. Weinman's work on the medal had been widely admired for the power of the depicted eagle.

Breen, in his comprehensive volume on US coins, said of the half dollar "Ms. Liberty wears the American flag, anticipating a rebellious counterculture by half a century". Though admiring the piece generally, he noted that Liberty is striding towards the east, that is towards war-torn Europe, and wrote "she points into the sky at nothing visible (perhaps aiming a warning at German warplanes?)". Breen objects to the use of the mountain pine on the reverse, calling it not particularly American nor especially notable except for an ability to thrive near the tree line.

Art historian Cornelius Vermeule wrote that the Walking Liberty half dollar "really treat[s] the obverse and reverse as a surface sculptural ensemble. The 'Walking Liberty' design particularly gives the true feeling of breath and sculptural services on the scale of a coin." Vermeule noted the resemblance of the half dollar to Roty's "Sower" but states that Weinman's piece "is an original creation, not a slavish copy". On the reverse, Vermeule admired the eagle, which dominates but does not overwhelm the design, and stated that the bird's feathers are "a marvelous tour de force", showing the influence of Augustus Saint-Gaudens, under whom Weinman studied. Vermeule characterized the Walking Liberty half dollar to be "one of the greatest coins of the United States—if not of the world".

Preparation 

Until a plaster model of one of his submissions was discovered at the Polasek Museum (formerly his house) in 2002, his participation was known only through the Mint's records.

After Weinman's success in the competition, he visited the Mint to discuss the conversion of his models to finished dies. On his first visit, he found Barber absent but had a productive talk with long-time Assistant Engraver George T. Morgan. I realize I am dealing with artistic temperaments at both ends." Woolley came to New York twice in April to examine MacNeil's evolving reverse design for the quarter, on  he also visited Weinman's studio and viewed progress on the models of his designs. A severe case of tonsillitis delayed Weinman's work, and caused him to request an extension of the  deadline. On , Woolley wrote Weinman that the designs, both for the dime and half dollar, were accepted by the Mint.

During June, the Mint's engraving department, headed by Barber, reduced the models to coin-sized hubs and prepared dies for experimental pattern coins, which were subsequently struck. Burdette suggests the haste with which the dies were prepared caused coins struck with them to appear worn and without sharp detail.
By , Weinman had viewed the first patterns, as he wrote to Woolley stating that he did not like the way the word "Liberty" on the obverse had turned out, and asking for the loan of two patterns so he could redo the lettering. On , Woolley wrote to Joyce, informing him of the loan and stating of the new pieces,

With Woolley's permission to redo the obverse, Weinman decided to remove the word "Liberty" from above the figure and place it above "In God We Trust" to the right of it. This permitted him to extend Liberty's head almost to the top of the coin, maximizing the size of the depiction. The letter "L" was placed in the concavity formed by the flag as it drapes under the figure's left elbow, and the rest of the word extended to the right from there, with the letter T in larger print, actually saving room as the larger size allowed the crossbar of the "T" to extend above the capitalized letters "R" and "Y". This allowed the letters to be squeezed closer together. I like it and believe you will." Weinman wrote to the former director on  that increasing the size of the figure of Liberty improved its appearance.

Weinman decided, on his own initiative, to rearrange the legends on the reverse. On the original pattern, "United States of America" is at the top of the reverse, with "Half Dollar" directly below and "E Pluribus Unum" at the bottom of the coin. On , Wilson nominated Woolley's successor, Friedrich Johannes Hugo von Engelken, who was promptly confirmed by the Senate.

Modification 

Actual production of the 50-cent piece was delayed as the Mint struggled to finalize Weinman's Mercury dime. On , production of the dime was halted as companies testing the new 10-cent piece found that the new pieces would not work in vending machines. The defect was found to be a "fin", excess metal at the edge of the coin, making it seem too thick when inserted in machines. The fin could also break off, leaving the silver coins underweight. The problem was found on the pattern half dollars as well. On , von Engelken wrote to Assistant Secretary Malburn, using information that Burdette suggests came from Barber:

Von Engelken's letter caused concern in the Secretary's office—McAdoo feared that if the Mint proved unable to successfully issue new coins, the Republicans might exploit the failure as an issue in the presidential race. The Secretary enquired how long it would take "our Mr. Barber" to produce new designs; after consultation with officials at the Philadelphia Mint, von Engelken replied that it would take six to eight months. The two officials decided that Weinman must be asked to modify his design for the half dollar—it was hoped that if Weinman shrank the figure of Liberty, and lowered the relief, the piece would prove coinable.

He left with two pattern half dollars and instructions to reduce the size of the figure of Liberty. Barber appealed to Joyce for permission to make major changes to Weinman's design, but this was initially refused. However, when an additional change by Weinman failed to eliminate the fin problem, Joyce gave in and allowed Barber a free hand. Engraver Barber shrank the design, moving the design further from the edge, and creating a wide space between design and rim. Barber insisted that this was the only way to prevent a fin and uneven edge. A beaded border was added within the rim. According to Burdette, patterns struck from the new dies were dull and uninteresting, as the size of the figures had lent them strength.

On , Weinman wrote to Joyce, asking how the Mint was getting on with the dies for the half dollar and dime, and expressing his willingness to come to Philadelphia. Joyce replied two days later, informing him that the design of the half dollar was being reduced in size to prevent recurrence of the edge difficulties, and informing him of the beaded border. Weinman responded hoping that Joyce would prevent the figure of Liberty from being unduly reduced and rendering his account. As the sculptor and superintendent corresponded, the Mint began the work of converting the Barber-modified designs to working dies from which circulation coins could be struck, but Joyce interceded before coining could begin. The Philadelphia Mint superintendent, who had the support of von Engelken, felt that Barber's modifications were unnecessary. Joyce believed that coins closer to Weinman's concept could be struck by lowering the relief slightly, adjusting the force with which the Mint's presses struck the planchets or blanks, and better preparing the planchets for striking. Joyce's position prevailed, and Barber and his department prepared working dies for striking of circulation pieces, omitting Barber's beaded border and wide space between rim and design.

In late December Weinman, who had received no update from the Mint since being told of the Barber modifications, but who had read in the newspapers that the half dollars were being struck, sent a $10 money order to Joyce with a request for 20 of the new coins. On , Weinman wrote to Joyce again, telling him the new pieces had been received in time to be given as New Year's gifts, and wishing the superintendent "every good wish to you for every day of the New Year and with thanks to the Almighty and yourself that the beads are not on the border of the Half Dollar".

Reception 
Although the dime's debut on  had seen considerable publicity, the Mint had little comment on the release of the half dollar and Standing Liberty quarter the following January. There were few newspaper mentions of the new half dollar; the United States was moving towards war with Germany, and the dime release had exhausted much of the public interest in the novelty of new coins. The quarter dominated what public attention there was with an argument over whether the eagle on its reverse was portrayed accurately. Despite the minimal publicity, according to a January 1917 report from Mint Adjuster Chaffin, all three mints initially had trouble keeping up with public demand for the new half dollars.

It stated that the Mint was working as hard as possible to keep up with demand, but that initially, quantities would be limited. Banking, the journal of the American Bankers Association, stated that "The designs of the new coins have been highly praised by those having expert knowledge of such matters". Connecticut's Meriden Daily Journal predicted readers would like the new half dollar five times as much as the new dime.

The Huntsville (Alabama) Mercury, however, expressed its dislike of the new half dollar. In a piece entitled "New half dollar is sick", it stated:

Production and collecting 

The mint marks had initially been placed on the obverse, the first time that had been done for a regular issue US half dollar since 1839. On , von Engelken ordered that the mint mark be moved from the obverse to the reverse, stating that the obverse placement had the appearance of a die defect. At that time, Von Engelken had resigned pending appointment to the post of president of the Federal Land Bank for the Third District; once he left to take that position, he was succeeded by Raymond T. Baker. In April Joyce asked Baker for written confirmation of von Engelken's order, and after he obliged, the mint mark was duly moved.  The majority of the 1917 half dollars struck at Denver (1917-D) and San Francisco (1917-S) bear the mint mark on the reverse.

Throughout the time in which the Mint struck the Walking Liberty half dollar, it had difficulty bringing out the design fully. According to Breen,

The San Francisco Mint especially had difficulty with the coins; many pieces struck there are noticeably weak. In 1918 Morgan, who had succeeded Barber as Engraver after the latter's death the previous year, modified the design, incising some of the details at Liberty's neck. According to Breen "The attempt was a failure". Morgan's successor, John R. Sinnock, made additional attempts in 1937 and 1938, with little better results. Breen suggested that the difficulties in striking the piece contributed to the willingness to replace it after World War II.

No Walking Liberty half dollar is especially rare, but many dates are scarce in mint state condition, particularly the 1921 and 1921-D. The Mint struck proof coins in 1916–1917 and 1936–1942, all at Philadelphia. The 1916 pieces were struck in very small numbers—Breen stated that he had seen only four—and only three 1917 proof coins are confirmed, most likely struck for VIPs at a time when proof coins were not sold to the public. A number of the later proof coins lack Weinman's monogram, apparently lost through overpolishing of dies. This is most common with the 1941 proof pieces—much of the year's production lacks the monogram—but is known for other years. A total of 74,400 proof coins were struck for the series.

There are few varieties in the series, and they are relatively minor. They principally involve the mint mark: several repunchings, one overpunching of a D over an S in 1942, and some changes in letter size. One oddity is the 1943/1942, which is not a true overdate but was formed by a working die struck once from a 1942-dated master die, and once from one dated 1943. Some 1946 half dollars show a doubled die on the reverse.

Replacement 

In 1947, Mint Director Nellie Tayloe Ross asked Engraver Sinnock to produce a design for a half dollar featuring Founding Father Benjamin Franklin. Ross had long been an admirer of Franklin, and wanted to see him on a coin. Mint officials had considered putting Franklin on the dime in 1941, but the project was shelved owing to heavy demands on the Mint for coins as the United States entered World War II. During the war, the Mint contemplated adding one or more new denominations of coinage; Sinnock prepared a Franklin design in anticipation of a new issue, which did not occur. In 1946, the Treasury replaced the Mercury dime with a piece depicting the recently deceased president, Franklin Roosevelt, who had been closely associated with the March of Dimes. With the Lincoln cent popular and politically inexpedient to replace, the half dollar was the only piece being struck which was available for redesign without congressional permission. The Treasury approved the new design. Although Sinnock died before the coin was issued, the Franklin half dollar went into production at the start of 1948, ending the Walking Liberty series. A total of 485,320,340 Walking Liberty half dollars were struck.

Design reuse 

Since 1986, Weinman's obverse design has been used as the obverse design for the American Silver Eagle bullion coin. In adapting the design, Mint Sculptor-Engraver John Mercanti and other members of the engraving staff strengthened many of the details. Mercanti noted that Weinman's original plaster was only  in diameter, and was softly modeled. Mercanti increased the detail so that the design, struck on a larger coin, would be bolder and would have a more even metal flow when struck than Weinman's original coin. Treasury Secretary James Baker chose a heraldic eagle design, by Mercanti, as the reverse of the American Silver Eagle.

The United States Mint in 2015 announced plans to restrike, in gold for collectors, the three silver coins first issued in 1916. This coin has the weight and fineness of gold, thus technically making it a bullion coin. The gold version of the Walking Liberty half dollar, containing a half ounce of gold and struck at the West Point Mint, went on sale to the public on November 17, 2016. A maximum of 75,000 were minted at the West Point Mint (mint mark "W" appears at the same place as on regular issues of this coin).

References 
Explanatory notes

Citations

Bibliography

 
 
 
 
 
 
 
 
 

Other sources

External links 

 US Walking Liberty Half Dollar by year and type
 NGC Coin Encyclopedia for Walking Liberty Half Dollars
 All about Walking Liberty Half Dollars

Eagles on coins
Currencies introduced in 1916
Fifty-cent coins of the United States
Goddess of Liberty on coins
Sun on coins
United States silver coins
Works by Adolph Weinman
Flags on coins